Jack Hampstead (1920-1992) was an Australian professional rugby league footballer who played in the 1940s and 1950s, and coached in the 1950s. A New South Wales state representative lock forward, he played in Sydney's NSWRFL Premiership for the Balmain club. Hampstead later became coach of the Canterbury-Bankstown club. His grandson is National Rugby League former referee Sean Hampstead.

Playing career 
Born in Sydney, New South Wales, Hampstead played 108 first grade games between 1939 and 1951, playing , and later . He played in the premiership-winning Balmain teams of 1944 and 1946.

Coaching 
For the 1953 season, Hampstead became the Canterbury-Bankstown coach. Of that year's eighteen matches, he won nine, and lost seven. However, in 1954 he lost fourteen of the eighteen, and won just four. He did not coach first-grade again.

Hampstead was a member of the Balmain Tigers' board until his death in 1992.

References

External links
https://web.archive.org/web/20110514025238/http://rl1908.com/Legends/dunn.htm
https://web.archive.org/web/20080719182615/http://www.tigers.org.au/Football_club/legends/legendtabs.html

1920 births
1992 deaths
Australian rugby league coaches
Australian rugby league players
Balmain Tigers players
Canterbury-Bankstown Bulldogs coaches
City New South Wales rugby league team players
New South Wales rugby league team players
Rugby league locks
Rugby league players from Sydney